Pearl G. Thrasher (1917 – January 23, 1972) was an American politician who served as a member of the Washington House of Representatives from 1945 to 1947.  She represented Washington's 31st legislative district as a Democrat.  She worked as an aircraft electrician.

References

1918 births
1972 deaths
Democratic Party members of the Washington House of Representatives
Women state legislators in Washington (state)